Lee Barkell originally from Kirkland Lake, Ontario is a Canadian figure skating coach, working with both singles and pairs, and a former competitive pair skater. With Melanie Gaylor, he won gold at the 1986 Fujifilm Trophy, 1986 Nebelhorn Trophy, and 1986 Grand Prix International St. Gervais.

Career 
Barkell competed in pair skating during the 1980s, in partnership with Melanie Gaylor. The pair won three international competitions — the 1986 Fujifilm Trophy, 1986 Nebelhorn Trophy and 1986 Grand Prix International St. Gervais. The duo received two Canadian national medals in the fours discipline — bronze in 1987 with Cynthia Coull / Mark Rowsom and silver in 1988 with Michelle Menzies / Kevin Wheeler.

After retiring from competition, Barkell began a coaching career in Barrie, Ontario, at the Mariposa School of Skating, where he was the director of pair skating. His former students include:
 Jeffrey Buttle (2008 World champion and 2006 Olympic bronze medalist).
 Christopher Mabee
 Meagan Duhamel / Ryan Arnold
 Anabelle Langlois / Cody Hay
 Nobunari Oda (2006 Four Continents champion)
 Carolyn MacCuish / Andrew Evans
 Jacinthe Larivière / Lenny Faustino
 Joey Russell
 Roman Sadovsky
 Patrick Myzyk

In the summer of 2014, Barkell moved to Toronto and started coaching at the Toronto Cricket, Skating and Curling Club. His students at the Cricket Club included: 
 Corey Circelli
 Gabrielle Daleman (2018 Canadian Champion, 2017 World bronze medalist and 2017 Four Continents silver medalist). He became her head coach in April 2015.
 Stephen Gogolev
 Liubov Ilyushechkina / Dylan Moscovitch (2017 Four Continents bronze medalists) from June 2014.

In the summer of 2019, Barkell moved to the Granite Club with Daleman.  He also continued as a coach for Gogolev, who relocated to California with Rafael Arutyunyan as his primary coach.  In September 2019, it was announced that he would be coaching four-time Japanese national champion Satoko Miyahara.  In January 2020, he began coaching World bronze medalist Vincent Zhou.  In June 2020, Barkell joined the coaching team of American national ladies' champion Alysa Liu.

Competitive highlights

Pairs with Gaylor

Fours with Gaylor and others

References

External links
 Biography at the Mariposa School of Skating (archived)

Canadian figure skating coaches
Canadian male pair skaters
Living people
Year of birth missing (living people)